Ricardo Fernandes Durão (13 June 1928 – 22 January 2021) was a Portuguese modern pentathlete. He competed at the 1952 Summer Olympics.

References

External links
 

1928 births
2021 deaths
Portuguese male modern pentathletes
Olympic modern pentathletes of Portugal
Modern pentathletes at the 1952 Summer Olympics